Lois Galgay Reckitt (born December 31, 1944) is an American feminist, human rights activist, LGBT rights activist, and domestic violence advocate. Called "one of the most prominent advocates in Maine for abused women", she served as executive director of Family Crisis Services in Portland, Maine for more than three decades. From 1984 to 1987 she served as executive vice president of the National Organization for Women in Washington, D.C. She is a co-founder of the Human Rights Campaign Fund, the Maine Coalition for Human Rights, the Maine Women's Lobby, and the first Maine chapter of the National Organization for Women. She was inducted into the Maine Women's Hall of Fame in 1998.

Early life and education
Lois Galgay was born in Cambridge, Massachusetts, to George Alphonsus Galgay and his wife, Marjorie Lois Wright Galgay. Her parents were both polio survivors. She was an only child. She graduated from Watertown High School and went on to Brandeis University, where she earned her B.A. in biology in 1966. At Brandeis, she played on the women's basketball team and had her first taste of activism as a member of the Northern Student Movement. She earned her M.A. in marine biology and biological oceanography at Boston University in 1968. She later received certification as a notary public in the State of Maine.

Career
Reckitt moved to Portland, Maine, after graduating from Boston University, being familiar with the state from summer vacations in her youth. She took her first job as a part-time instructor of marine biology at Southern Maine Technical College. From 1970 to 1979 she was the swimming director at the Portland YWCA.

Reckitt helped establish the Family Crisis Shelter in Portland, Maine, which was formalized as Family Crisis Services in 1977. In 2018 the organisation was renamed Through These Doors. She served as executive director of Family Crisis Services from 1979 to 1984. In 1984 she moved to Washington, D.C., to an elected post as executive vice president of the National Organization for Women, a position she held until 1987. From 1987 to 1989 she was deputy director of the Human Rights Campaign Fund, a political action committee that she had co-founded in 1980.

In 1990 she returned to Portland and resumed the executive directorship of Family Crisis Services. By 2010 she was overseeing a budget of $1.4 million with 30 staff members, three outreach offices, and a battered women's shelter. She lobbied for legal reforms to protect victims of domestic abuse, leading to the passage of "anti-stalking legislation, a domestic violence homicide review panel, and gun control measures for abusers". She often spoke at conferences and on panels in support of women's rights and LGBT rights. She was frequently quoted in newspaper reports on domestic violence and murder, and organized memorial gatherings for victims of domestic violence. She retired from the executive directorship in October 2015.

She was elected to the Maine House of Representatives as a Democrat from South Portland (District 31) in 2016.

Other activities
In 1973 Reckitt co-founded the Maine chapter of the National Organization for Women; she also helped establish the Maine Right to Choose in 1975, the Maine Coalition for Human Rights in 1976, the Maine Women's Lobby, the Maine Coalition for Human Rights, and the Matlovich Society for gay rights and AIDS awareness. In 1993 she began serving as adjunct faculty at the University of Southern Maine and Springfield College.

Memberships
Reckitt was a board member of the National Organization for Women (NOW) for 14 years and served on several NOW committees, including the national committee to end violence against women, the committee on pornography (which she chaired from 1990 to 1992), and the lesbian rights committee. She served on the board of directors of the Maine Women's Lobby from 1979 to 1983, on the board of the Southern Regional Alcohol and Drug Abuse Council from 1982 to 1984, on the board of the National Coalition Against Domestic Violence from 2005 to 2014 (including two years as president), and on the board of the Maine Citizens Against Handgun Violence. She is an advisory committee member of the LGBT Collection at the University of Southern Maine. Her chairmanships include the Maine Coalition for Family Crisis Services and the Maine Commission on Domestic Abuse; she was vice-chair for the board of trustees at the Maine Criminal Justice Academy.

Awards and recognition
Reckitt received the Outstanding Contribution to Law Enforcement award from the Maine Chiefs of Police Association in 1996, the Advocate for Justice Award from the Maine Judicial Branch in 2001, the John W. Ballou Distinguished Service Award from the Maine State Bar Association in 2005, and the Deborah Morton Award from the University of New England in 2013. She was inducted into the Maine Women's Hall of Fame in 1998.

She is listed in Feminists Who Changed America, 1963–1975 and was named "Feminist of the Month – 2010" by the Veteran Feminists of America.

Personal life
Galgay Reckitt was married twice to men. During her second marriage, she realized she was lesbian and came out in 1976 while in her early thirties. She now lives with her partner, Lyn Kjenstad Carter, in South Portland.

Selected articles

 (with Julie Alfred Sullivan)

References

External links
Facebook page
"Lois Galgay Reckitt interview" (video) August 26, 2008
"Prostitution" Maine Public Radio interview, October 24, 2012

American women's rights activists
American LGBT rights activists
LGBT state legislators in Maine
LGBT people from Massachusetts
Maine Democrats
National Organization for Women people
Brandeis University alumni
Boston University alumni
People from Cambridge, Massachusetts
Activists from Portland, Maine
1944 births
Living people
Watertown High School (Massachusetts) alumni
21st-century American women politicians
21st-century American politicians
Women state legislators in Maine